Code of the Fearless is a 1939 American Western film directed by Raymond K. Johnson and written by Fred Myton. The film stars Fred Scott, Claire Rochelle, John Merton, Walter McGrail, George Sherwood and Harry Harvey Sr. The film was released on January 5, 1939, by Spectrum Pictures.

Plot
Fred Jamison gets kicked out of the Rangers and starts his outlaw life, however this is just a plot between Fred and the Captain of the Rangers, so Fred can dismantle Red Kane and Jim Davis' gang from within.

Cast          
Fred Scott as Fred Jamison
Claire Rochelle as Jean Morrison
John Merton as Red Kane
Walter McGrail as Captain Rawlins
George Sherwood as Jim Davis
Harry Harvey Sr. as Old Timer
William Woods as Li Hung Lo
Donald Gallaher as Pete Howard

References

External links
 

1939 films
American Western (genre) films
1939 Western (genre) films
Films directed by Raymond K. Johnson
American black-and-white films
1930s English-language films
1930s American films